This is a partial list of notable hospitals in the Philippines.

Luzon

La Union -Ilocos Training Regional Medical Center (ITRMC)

Abra
Bangued Christian Hospital – Torrijos Street, Bangued

Baguio
Baguio General Hospital and Medical Center
SLU-Hospital of Sacred Heart
Notre Dame de Chartres Hospital
Pines City Doctors‘ Hospital
Baguio Medical Center

Cagayan
Cagayan Valley Medical Center – Carig Sur, Tuguegarao
People's General Hospital - Centro 07, Tuguegarao

Metro Manila

Pampanga
Jose B. Lingad Memorial Regional Hospital – Dolores, San Fernando
The Medical City Clark – Clark Global City, Mabalacat
Nueva Ecija

 General Tinio Doctors General Hospital
 Heart of Jesus Hospital
 Immaculate Concepcion Medical Center of Central Luzon, Inc. 
 Good Samaritan Hospital, Inc.
 Nueva Ecija Doctors Hospital
 Paulino J. General Memorial Research and Medical Center
 Premier General Hospital
 Wesleyan University Hospital
 Talavera General Hospital
 Nueva Ecija Medical Citi
 Lacson General Hospital
 San Jose City General Hospital
 Ospital ng Lungsod ng San Jose
 Santo Domingo District Hospital

Camarines Sur
Bicol Medical Center - Naga, Camarines Sur

Sorsogon
Bulan Medicare Hospital - Bulan
Castilla District Hospital - Castilla
Fernando Duran Sr. Hospital - Sorsogon Diversion Road, Macabog, Sorsogon City
Irosin District Hospital - San Julian, Irosin
Metro Health Specialists Hospital Inc. - Sorsogon Diversion Road, Sorsogon City
Prieto Diaz Medicare Hospital - Prieto Diaz
Sorsogon Medical Mission Group and Health Services Cooperative, Pangpang, Sorsogon City
Sts. Peter and Paul Hospital - Brgy. Road, Balogo, Sorsogon City

Zambales
TotalMED Multispecialty Center – Olongapo (Subic)

Visayas

Metro Cebu
Cebu Doctors' University Hospital – President Sergio Suico Osmeña Boulevard, Cebu City
Chong Hua Hospital – Don Mariano Cui Corner Governor Julio A. Llorente Streets, Fuente Osmeña, Cebu City
Chong Hua Hospital Mandaue – Mantawe Ave, Tipolo, Mandaue
Vicente Gullas Memorial Hospital – Engr. Joaquin L. Panis Street (BANTAL Highway), Mandaue
Vicente Sotto Memorial Medical Center – Governor Buenaventura P. Rodriguez Street, Sambag II, Cebu City

Iloilo
Iloilo Mission Hospital – Mission Road, Jaro, Iloilo City
West Visayas State University Medical Center – E. Lopez Street, Jaro, Iloilo City

Leyte
ACE Medical Center Tacloban – 78 Marasbaras, (Near Robinsons Marasbaras) Tacloban
Divine Word Hospital – Avenida Veteranos Street, Tacloban
Eastern Visayas Medical Center – Magsaysay Boulevard, Tacloban
Governor Benjamin T. Romualdez General Hospital and Schistosomiasis Center - Palo

Negros Occidental

 Corazon Locsin Montelibano Memorial Regional Hospital - Bacolod, Negros Occidental

Negros Oriental

Silliman University Medical Center (SUMCFI) – Aldecoa Drive, Dumaguete
Negros Oriental Provincial Hospital - North National Highway, Dumaguete
Holy Child Hospital – Bishop Surban St., Brgy. 3, Dumaguete
ACE Dumaguete Doctors Hospital – Daro, Dumaguete
Negros Polymedic Hospital - Sibulan, Negros Oriental
ACE Medical Center - Bayawan, Negros Oriental

Mindanao

Cotabato
 Anecito T. Pesante, Sr. Memorial Hospital, Co. – Poblacion 1, Midsayap
 Kidapawan Medical Specialist Center, Inc. – Sudapin, Kidapawan

Cotabato City
Cotabato Regional Hospital and Medical Center – Sinsual Avenue, Rosary Heights

General Santos
SOCSARGEN County Hospital – Bula-Lagao Road, Arradaza Street

Lanao del Sur
Amai Pakpak Medical Center – Datu Saber, Marawi

Maguindanao
Iranun District Hospital – Parang

Metro Davao
Davao Doctors Hospital – Elpidio Quirino Avenue, Davao City
Davao Regional Medical Center – Apokon, Tagum
Somoso General Hospital – Panabo
Southern Philippines Medical Center – Jose P. Laurel Avenue, Bajada, Davao City

Metro Cagayan de Oro
Capitol University Medical Center – C.M.Recto Avenue, Gusa, Cagayan de Oro

Zamboanga City
Ace Medical Center - Don Alfaro Street
Brent Hospital - R.T. Lim Boulevard
Ciudad Medical Zamboanga - Mayor Vitaliano Agan Avenue
Hospital de Zamboanga - Pilar Street
Mindanao Central Sanitarium - Pasobolong
West Metro Medical Center - Veterans Avenue Extension
Zamboanga City Medical Center - Evangelista Street, Sta. Catalina
Zamboanga Doctor's Hospital - Veterans Avenue
Zamboanga Peninsula Medical Center - Maria Clara Lobregat Highway Putik

Zamboanga del Norte
Zamboanga del Norte Medical Center – National Highway, Sicayab, Dipolog
Corazon C. Aquino Hospital - Circumferential Road, Biasong, Dipolog
Dr. Jose Rizal Memorial Hospital - National Highway, Lawaan, Dapitan

References

External links
Private Hospitals in Davao City
Hospitals in the Philippines